The Treasury of Lives is an online, open access, peer reviewed, collection of biographical essays, which can be seen as an encyclopedia of historical figures from Tibet, Inner Asia, and the Himalayan Region.

Background
The Treasury of Lives is an online series of biographical essays, used as an encyclopedia, that was established in 2007 with the mission of providing open access to the lived history of Tibet and surrounding regions. Biographies are intended for a wide audience of scholars, independent researchers and practitioners. Essays cover a wide range of figures, from Buddhist masters to artists and political officials, most of which are peer reviewed. Website localization into Tibetan and Chinese languages in is progress in order to meet the growing numbers of users active in those languages.

The Treasury of Lives is a collaborative resource with over 100 contributing authors. It has published over 1100 biographies. Many essays are peer-reviewed and benefit from extensive internal and external links to associated art, maps, place descriptions, family and clan information, and timelines.

The Treasury of Lives was originally known as The Tibetan Lineages Project, led by Moke Mokotoff, Matthieu Ricard and Vivian Kurz. Alexander Gardner, Ph.D., serves as the executive director and Editor in Chief. The Treasury of Lives is also closely linked with Buddhist Digital Resource Center (BDRC, formerly known as TBRC). The late E. Gene Smith and Jeff Wallman of the BDRC were instrumental in defining the vision of the site and in forging the plan for its development; and its database is closely linked to BDRC.

The project was initially funded and incubated by the Shelley and Donald Rubin Foundation. It became an independent non-profit organization in 2017.

Authors
Authors of the biographies in The Treasury of Lives include:

 Jean Luc Achard - researcher at the Centre national de la recherche scientifique (CNRS) in Paris and editor of the Revue d'Études Tibétaines
 Suzanne Bessenger - Assistant Professor of Religious Studies at Randolph College
 José Ignacio Cabezón - Professor of Religious Studies at the University of California, Santa Barbara and co editor in chief of the Journal of the International Association of Tibetan Studies (JIATS) 
 Dorje Penjore - senior researcher at the Centre for Bhutan Studies
 Françoise Pommaret - director of research at the  Institut National des Langues et Civilisations Orientales (CNRS) in Paris 
 Tsering Shakya -  Institute of Asian Research (IAR) at the University of British Columbia
 Gene Smith (1936 –2010) - renowned Tibetologist
 Heather Stoddard -  professor at the Institut National des Langues et Civilisations Orientales (CNRS), Paris
 Gray Tuttle - Professor of Modern Tibetan Studies at Columbia University
 Cameron David Warner - Postdoctoral Fellow in Buddhism and Modernity Department of Anthropology and Ethnography, Aarhus University
 Jeff Watt - Director and Chief Curator of Himalayan Art Resources.
Samten Karmay - Director of Research Emeritus at Institut National des Langues et Civilisations Orientales (CNRS), Paris

References

Sources

External links
 

American digital libraries
Biographical dictionaries
Books of Buddhist biography
Geographic region-oriented digital libraries
Himalayan peoples